National Highway 752B, commonly referred to as NH 752B is a national highway in India. It is a spur road of National Highway 52. NH-752B traverses the state of Madhya Pradesh in India.

Route 

Rajasthan/M.P. border - Susner, Khilchipur, Biaora, Maksundangarh, Lateri, Sironj.

Junctions  

  near Zirapur.
  near Khilchipur.
  near Biaora.

See also 

 List of National Highways in India
 List of National Highways in India by state

References

External links 

 NH 752B on OpenStreetMap

National highways in India
National Highways in Madhya Pradesh